The Polynesian Football Hall of Fame is a hall of fame that honors the greatest players, coaches, and contributors of Polynesian descent in the sport of American football. It was established in 2013 by former National Football League (NFL) players Jesse Sapolu and Maa Tanuvasa. Board members include Troy Polamalu, Via Sikahema, June Jones, and Reno Mahe. The hall is located at the Polynesian Cultural Center in Oahu, Hawaii.

Inductees

2014
 Kurt Gouveia
 Olin Kreutz
 Kevin Mawae
 Junior Seau
 Jack Thompson
 Herman Wedemeyer
 Ken Niumatalolo

2015
 Luther Elliss
 Jesse Sapolu
 Ray Schoenke
 Mosi Tatupu
 Mark Tuinei
 Russ Francis

2016
 Charley Ane
 Rocky Freitas
 Troy Polamalu
 Vai Sikahema
 Al Lolotai

2017
 Junior Ah You
 Riki Ellison
 Chris Naeole
 Maa Tanuvasa
 John Manumaleuna

2018
 Bob Apisa
 Herman Clark
 Ma'ake Kemoeatu
 Manu Tuiasosopo
 Kimo von Oelhoffen

2019
Joe Salave'a
Dan Saleaumua
Lofa Tatupu
Marques Tuiasosopo

2020
David Dixon
Frank Manumaleuga
Haloti Ngata
Dominic Raiola

2021
Al Noga
Niko Noga
Charlie Wedemeyer

2022
Malcom Floyd
Mike Iupati
Tom Kaulukukui

2023
Larry Warford
Manti Te'o
Harry Field

Polynesian Bowl 
In 2017, the organisation began to back a high school football all-star game known as the Polynesian Bowl, held at Aloha Stadium.

See Also 
 Polynesian Football Player of the Year Award

References

External links
 Official website

Halls of fame in Hawaii
All-sports halls of fame